HLU may refer to:

 Heaviside–Lorentz units
 Helensburgh Upper railway station, in Scotland
 Hieroglyphic Luwian, an extinct Anatolian language